Washington Township is an inactive township in Johnson County, in the U.S. state of Missouri.

Washington Township was established in 1835, taking its name from President George Washington.

References

Townships in Missouri
Townships in Johnson County, Missouri